Parafomoria ladaniphila is a moth of the family Nepticulidae. It is found in Portugal and southern Spain.

The length of the forewings is 1.7-1.85 mm for males and 1.7-1.8 mm for females. Adults are on wing from June to July.

The larvae feed on Cistus ladanifer. They mine the leaves of their host plant. The mine consists of a short, very narrow, almost invisible gallery, soon becoming a full depth circular blotch, in which the frass is concentrated in a circular spot in the centre. The larva often hides beneath the aggregation of frass. The leaf swells in the position of the mine, forming a blister on the leaf underside. Pupation takes place outside of the mine.

External links
Fauna Europaea
bladmineerders.nl
The Cistaceae-feeding Nepticulidae (Lepidoptera) of the western Palaearctic region

Nepticulidae
Moths of Europe
Moths described in 1910